The Wyoming United States House election for 1902 was held on November 4, 1902. Former Republican representative Frank Wheeler Mondell defeated Democratic Charles P. Clemmons with 64.00% of the vote.

Results

References

1902
Wyoming
1902 Wyoming elections